Ju County or Juxian is a county of Rizhao City, in the south of Shandong Province, People's Republic of China. As of the end of 2021, the total registered population of Ju County was 1.167 million.

The Fulaishan Scenic Area is located on the western border of Ju County. It is noteworthy for an ancient ginkgo tree that grows in the center of the front yard of Dinglin Temple and is believed to be nearly 4000 years old.The tree is 26.7 meters high and 15.7 meters thick, covering an area of more than 600 square meters. In 1982, UNESCO conducted a special study on this tree and broadcast its close-up to the world.

Administrative divisions
As 2012, this county is divided to 18 towns and 3 townships.
Towns

Townships
Zhailihe Township
Guozhuang Township
Kushan Township

Climate

Famous people

Liu Xie 
Liu Xie (about 467-539) Word Yan, lived in Dongguan in the Northern and Southern Dynasties, who is the writer of "Wenxindiaolong".

Song Ping 
Song Ping, born in Luozhuang Zhaoxian in 1917, graduated from the College of Agriculture at Peking University, Tsinghua University study in 1936. He joined the Chinese Communist Party in 1937. In June 1989, he was elected as the Politburo Standing Committee in the CCP Fourth Plenary Session of the Thirteenth.

Honor

National Civilized County 
In 2011, Ju was honored as the National Civilized County.

China's Most Unusual Charm County 
In 2009, Ju was honored as China's Most Unusual Charm County.

See also
Ju (city), an ancient Chinese city located within this territory
Shui Dong, a village in Luohe, Ju County
Xia Tun, a village in Guozhuang, Ju County
Zhuangjiashan, a village in Dongguan, Ju County

External links
 official website

References

 
Counties of Shandong
Rizhao